Rao Bahadur Mahadev Vishwanath Dhurandhar,   (18 March 1867 – 1 June 1944) was an Indian painter and postcard artist from the British colonial era. Among his most popular paintings are his illustrations of average colonial-era women.

Early life

Dhurandhar was born in a Marathi 
Pathare Prabhu family at Kolhapur, Maharashtra. After schooling at Rajaram High School in Kolhapur, he was accepted into J.J. School of Art, Bombay in 1890. There he was student of the artist John Griffiths. As a student he won many medals for his work. He graduated in 1895.

Career
After graduating from  J. J. School of Art, Dhurandhar was offered a position at the same school in 1896 where he spent the rest of his career. In 1910, he was appointed as the Head Master. He was appointed Inspector of Drawing and Craft in 1918 and served in that position until 1931. He was the Vice-Principal for two years before retiring. In the year 1938, Dhurandhar was elected as the Fellow of the Royal Society of Arts.

Style and works
His popular works include documenting the city of Bombay and its people, as well as painting scenes from Hindu mythology and Omar Khayyam series. A prolific artist, Dhurandhar is said to have made some thousands of paintings and illustrations, including some that were turned into lithographic prints, such as his illustrations for the book Women of India by Otto Rothfield (1920). Dhurandhar also designed postcards, provided the illustrations for the S. M. Edwardes By-Ways of Bombay (1912) and C. A. Kincaid's Deccan Nursery Tales, besides drawing cartoons for the Gujarati periodicals Aram and Bhoot. He also made religious illustrations published by the Ravi Varma Press. He wrote an autobiography in Marathi about his years at the J.J. School. In 1926, he was commissioned by the ruler of Aundh State, Maharaja Bhawanrao Pantpratinidhi to make paintings on the life of Shivaji.

Paintings

References

Further reading
 
 Allan Life. "Picture Postcards by M.V. Dhurandhar: Scenes and Types of India-with a Difference," in Visual Resources (XVII, pp. 401–416, 2001).
 Dhurandhar, M. V. "Kalamandirantil Ekechalish Varsham" [Marathi autobiography] Bombay, 1940.

External links

 Paintings of M. V. Dhurandhar
 
 

Indian portrait painters
Indian illustrators
Indian art educators
Sir Jamsetjee Jeejebhoy School of Art alumni
1867 births
1944 deaths
Marathi people
Rai Bahadurs
People from Kolhapur
Academic staff of Sir J. J. School of Art
19th-century Indian painters
20th-century Indian painters
Indian male painters
Painters from Maharashtra
Bombay School
19th-century Indian male artists
20th-century Indian male artists